Shem Tov, Shem-Tov, Shem Tob or Shem-tov (Hebrew: שם טוב‎, meaning a good name or reputability)  is a Jewish name that may refer to the following notable people:

Shem Tob ben Isaac Ardutiel (c.1290–1369), Spanish Hebrew writer 
Shem-Tob ben Isaac of Tortosa, 13th century Provençal rabbi and physician
Shem Tob Gaguine (1884–1953), British Sephardic rabbi 
Shem Tov ben Abraham ibn Gaon (c.1283–1330), Spanish Talmudist and kabbalist
Shem-Tov ibn Falaquera (c.1225–1290), Spanish Jewish philosopher and poet
Shem Tov ibn Shem Tov (c.1390–1440), Spanish kabbalist 
Shem Tov Levi (born 1950), Israeli singer, pianist, flautist and composer
Shem-Tov Sabag (born 1959), Israeli Olympic marathon runner

Baal Shem Tov  (c.1698–1760), Jewish mystic and healer from Poland
Joseph ibn Shem-Tov (died 1480), Judæo-Spanish writer
Moshe Shem Tov (1924–2005), chairman of The Association of the Deaf in Israel 
Tomer Shem-Tov (born 1978), Israeli football player
Victor Shem-Tov (1915–2014), Israeli politician

Hebrew masculine given names
Hebrew-language surnames